The Squall is a 1929 American pre-Code drama film directed by Alexander Korda and starring Myrna Loy, Richard Tucker, Alice Joyce and Loretta Young, and based on the 1926 play The Squall by Jean Bart.

Plot
In Hungary, a beautiful, young gypsy girl, Nubi, seeks shelter during a sudden squall. Nubi is given shelter by a well-to-do farmer and his family. The farmer and his family hide the girl when a brutish, older gypsy lover arrives to claim the girl and take her away. The older gypsy leaves, and Nubi is allowed to stay on with the family as a servant. Nubi does little useful work as a servant in the house, and instead proceeds to use her feminine charms to entice and bewitch various male members of the household, leading to many scenes of discord, anger, and jealousy. The spell that Nubi has put on the house is only lifted at the end of the movie when the older gypsy returns, and carries Nubi away—with the farmer and his family no longer willing to offer protection to the troublesome gypsy girl.

Cast

Richard Tucker as Josef Lajos
Alice Joyce as Maria Lajos
Loretta Young as Irma
Carroll Nye as Paul Lajos
ZaSu Pitts as Lena
Harry Cording as Peter
George Hackathorne as Niki
Marcia Harris as Aunt Anna
Knute Erickson as Uncle Dani
Myrna Loy as Nubi
Nicholas Soussanin as El Moro

Production
The film was Korda's first talkie, although his two previous films Night Watch and Love and the Devil had featured sound effects and music as part of the gradual transition from silent to sound film. The film was shot at night at the Burbank studios, as the only sound stage there was used by Warner Brothers during the day.

Preservation status
The film survives intact with its Vitaphone soundtrack and exists in the Library of Congress and 16mm print survive. The film has been released to DVDR on the Warner Archive Collection label.

References

External links

The Squall at SilentEra
Allmovie synopsis of The Squall with DVD picture
Pre-Code lobby poster for The Squall featuring Myrna Loy's character

Films directed by Alexander Korda
First National Pictures films
American films based on plays
Films set in Hungary
1929 drama films
American black-and-white films
1920s English-language films
1920s American films